Mehdi in Black and Hot Mini Pants is a 1972 Iranian romance film directed by Nezam Fatemi, and starring Naser Malek Motiee, Farrokhlagha Houshmand, Fereshteh Jenabi, Abdolali Homayoun, Morteza Aghili, Hamideh Kheirabadi and Christian Patterson.

Plot
Mehdi in Black falls in love with a foreign girl who loves him back. However, in order for them to get married, Mehdi has to fulfill his father's will and marry off her sisters first. He is able to quickly solve this problem with the help of his sisters' suitors and marry his beloved.

References

External links 
 

1972 films
1970s romantic comedy-drama films
1970s Persian-language films
Iranian romantic comedy films
Iranian black-and-white films
Iranian romantic drama films